Sarah Masen is an American singer-songwriter originally from the suburbs of Detroit, Michigan. For several years she has lived in Nashville, Tennessee, with her husband, the author David Dark, and their three children. Initially signed to Charlie Peacock's re:think label, and subsequently to Word Records, she is now independent. As a songwriter, she has collaborated with Béla Fleck, Julie Lee and Sam Ashworth.

Background 

In 1998 she released Carry Us Through, and in 1999 BEC Recordings reissued The Holding as a Sarah Masen solo album. After the release of The Dreamlife of Angels in 2001, Masen did not release her own new material for six years, although in 2004 she did contribute two tracks to the album Stars and Sirens by Pristina, a collective of female artists teamed with the producer Joey B. of The Echoing Green.

Jon Foreman, of the band Switchfoot, is Masen's brother-in-law (Foreman is married to her sister Emily), and featured Masen on several tracks on his Summer EP.

Discography
Albums
 The Holding (1995, independent)
 Sarah Masen (1996, re:think)
 Carry Us Through (1998, re:think)
 The Holding (1999, re-issue, REX)
 The Dreamlife of Angels (2001, Word)
EPs
 Women's Work Is Alchemy (2007 EP, independent)
 A History of Light and Shadow (2007 EP, independent)
 Magic That Works (2007 EP, independent)

References

External links 
 
 Interview With ALLALOM Music

Living people
1975 births
People from Nashville, Tennessee
American women singer-songwriters
American singer-songwriters
21st-century American singers
21st-century American women singers